Hannu Patronen (born 23 May 1984) is a Finnish former footballer who played as a centre back. He has previously played as a defensive midfielder, and spent time with the Finnish side FC Honka, Swedish side Helsingborgs IF and Norwegian side Sogndal Fotball. Patronen has been capped at international level for Finland.

Career
He made 47 caps for his Finnish club side FC Honka before agreeing on a move to Allsvenskan outfit Helsingborgs IF on 12 July 2008. Patronen signed a 3,5 years long contract with the Swedes. Patronen made his debut with Helsingborg on 15 July 2008 at home against AIK and played for 90 minutes, when his new club won 2–1.

After playing 44 matches and scoring two goals in Allsvenskan with Helsingborg, Patronen was signed on a two-year contract by the Norwegian Tippeligaen side Sogndal ahead of the 2012 season as the replacement for Even Hovland, who had transferred to the reigning Tippeligaen champions Molde. Patronen soon became an integral part of Sogndal's central defence, and he played 54 matches and scored two goals in Tippeligaen during his two first seasons with the club. After his two-year contract expired he signed a one-year extension with Sogndal, which kept him to the club to the end of the 2014 season.

Patronen signed for Helsinki IFK 27 December 2018.

Career statistics

References

External links 
 
 
 
 

1984 births
Living people
People from Järvenpää
Finnish footballers
Finland international footballers
FC Honka players
Helsingborgs IF players
Sogndal Fotball players
Helsingin Jalkapalloklubi players
HIFK Fotboll players
Allsvenskan players
Norwegian First Division players
Eliteserien players
Finnish expatriate footballers
Expatriate footballers in Sweden
Finnish expatriate sportspeople in Sweden
Expatriate footballers in Norway
Finnish expatriate sportspeople in Norway
Association football defenders
Sportspeople from Uusimaa